Woodlands Primary School is the name of several primary schools:

 Woodlands Primary School, Carnoustie, Scotland
 Woodlands Primary School, Leeds, England
 Woodlands Primary School, Pietermaritzburg, South Africa
 Woodlands Primary School, Singapore, Woodlands, Singapore